The Atlanta Black Star is the largest black-owned digital publication in the United States. The publication is based in Atlanta, Georgia which focuses on the African American perspective on politics. It was founded in 2012 by Neil "Jelani" Nelson, Tracy Dornelly, and Andre Moore. The site has over 14 million monthly unique visitors.

Media outlets such as the Yahoo News, The Washington Post, The New York Times, Heavy.com, and The Daily Dot have republished or cited the contents of the Atlanta Black Star. The site is part of a partnership program with Facebook.

References

External links
 Official Website

African-American newspapers
Publications established in 2012
Mass media in Atlanta
Newspapers published in Georgia (U.S. state)